Syedna Abduttayyeb Zakiuddin II (died on 12 Zil Qa'dah 1110 AH/1692 AD, Jamnagar, India) was the 35th Da'i al-Mutlaq of the Dawoodi Bohras. He succeeded the 34th Dai Syedna Ismail Badruddin I to the religious post. Syedna Zakiuddin became Da'i al-Mutlaq in 1085 AH/1676 AD. His period of Dawat was 1085–1110 AH/1676–1692 AD. He is a descendant of Moulaya Bharmal.

Life
Syedna Abduttayeb was born in 1038 AH during the tenure of the 29th Dai, Syedna Abduttayyeb Zakiuddin I. He received elementary education from his grandfather Maulaya Raj bin Maulaya Adam. He received his higher education first from a tutor and then from a religious school. He had committed the entire Qur'an to memory. His father Syedna Ismail Badruddin I performed nass on him when he was 28.

Syedna Abduttayeb was 47 when he assumed the office of the Dai in 1676 AD and retained Jamnagar as the center of administration. He visited Ahmedabad in 1090 AH to launch several religious, economic and social revival programs.

Succession
He conferred succession on his son Syedna Musa Kalimuddin in 1091 AH.

Death
Syedna Zakiuddin died at the age of 63 due to ailing health. He is buried in the Mazar-e-Badri in Jamnagar, India.

References

Further reading
 The Ismaili, their history and doctrine by Farhad Daftary (Chapter -Mustalian Ismailism- p. 300-310)
 The Uyun al-akhbar is the most complete text written by an Ismaili/Tayyibi/Dawoodi 19th Dai Sayyedna Idris bin Hasan on the history of the Ismaili community from its origins up to the 12th century CE period of the Fatimid caliphs al-Mustansir (d. 487/1094), the time of Musta'lian rulers including al-Musta'li (d. 495/1101) and al-Amir (d. 524/1130), and then the Tayyibi Ismaili community in Yemen.

Dawoodi Bohra da'is
1692 deaths
Year of birth unknown
17th-century Ismailis